Bathwater may refer to:

"Bathwater" (song), a 2000 song by No Doubt
Bathwater, water used in bathing
"Bathwater", 2006 documentary by Kris Williams

See also
Don't throw the baby out with the bathwater